The Division of Fawkner was an Australian Electoral Division in Victoria. The division was created in 1906 as a replacement for Southern Melbourne, and was abolished itself in 1969. It was named for John Pascoe Fawkner, one of the founders of Melbourne. It was located in the inner southern suburbs of Melbourne, including at various times Prahran, South Yarra, St Kilda and Toorak. It was usually a safe conservative seat, but was occasionally won by the Australian Labor Party.

The seat is best known as the starting point for the career of future Prime Minister Harold Holt, who held the seat from 1935 until 1949, when he followed most of its wealthier portion into Higgins.

Members

Election results

1906 establishments in Australia
Constituencies established in 1906
1969 disestablishments in Australia
Constituencies disestablished in 1969
Fawkner